The 7/27 Tour was the second major headlining concert tour by American girl group Fifth Harmony, in support of their second studio album 7/27 (2016). The tour began in Lima, Peru on June 22, 2016, and concluded in Singapore on April 8, 2017.

Background and development 
On May 20, 2016, the group announced the North American leg of the tour, consisting of 32 shows in the United States and one in Canada. The North American leg began on July 27, 2016 in Manchester, New Hampshire in reference to their album title and fourth anniversary since being formed on The X Factor. On June 21, the group announced the European leg of the tour with 23 dates starting in Dublin, Ireland on October 4 and commencing on October 29 in Antwerp, Belgium.

The opening acts were JoJo, Victoria Monét, Camryn, Lali, and Jake Miller. The Asian leg of the tour was announced in January 2017, following group member Camila Cabello's departure.

Commercial performance 
In January 2017, Pollstars top 200 North American tours charts were announced. Fifth Harmony ranked at #199 on the list with a domestic gross of $5.1 million from 33 shows.

Set list 
This set list is representative of the show on September 9, 2016 in Irvine, California. It is not representative of all concerts for the duration of the tour.

 "That's My Girl"
 "Miss Movin' On"
 "Sledgehammer"
 "Reflection"
 "This Is How We Roll"
 "Scared of Happy"
 "Write On Me"
 "I Lied"
 "No Way"
 "We Know"
 "Dope"
 "Squeeze"
 "Big Bad Wolf"
 "Boss"
 "Not That Kinda Girl"
 "All in My Head (Flex)"
 "Brave, Honest, Beautiful"
 "Gonna Get Better"
 "Voicemail"
 "Worth It"
Encore
  "Work from Home"

Shows

Cancelled shows

Notes

References

dia:REFB for instructions on how to add citations. -->

2016 concert tours
2017 concert tours
Fifth Harmony concert tours